Naveh Kesh (also Romanized as Nāveh Kesh and Naukash; also known as Sarāb-e Nāveh Kash, Sarāb-e Nāveh Kesh, Sarāb-e Nowkash, and Sarāb Naukash) is a village in Dowreh Rural District, Chegeni District, Dowreh County, Lorestan Province, Iran. At the 2006 census, its population was 1,070, in 245 families.

References 

Towns and villages in Dowreh County